Karawaci may refer to:
Karawaci, Tangerang, a subdistrict of Tangerang, Banten, Indonesia
Lippo Karawaci, a planned community in the subdistrict

See also
Karawasi, a Surinamese musical instrument